The 2014 UEFA European Under-17 Championship was the 13th edition of the UEFA European Under-17 Championship, an annual football competition between men's under-17 national teams organised by UEFA. The final tournament was hosted for the first time in Malta, from 9 to 21 May 2014, after their bid was selected by the UEFA Executive Committee on 20 March 2012 in Istanbul, Turkey.

Fifty-three teams participated in a two-round qualification stage, taking place between September 2013 and March 2014, to determine the seven teams joining the hosts. Players born after 1 January 1997 were eligible to participate in this competition. This edition marked the first appearance of a national team from Gibraltar,
and was the first UEFA competition allowing referees to use a vanishing spray when setting free kicks. Live broadcast was provided by Eurosport 2 and Eurosport International.

England beat the Netherlands in the final on penalties to secure their second European under-17 title, four years after their first, and the second to be won by coach John Peacock. The 2013 champions, Russia, failed to qualify for the final tournament.

Qualification

Qualification for the final tournament of the 2014 UEFA European Under-17 Championship consisted of two rounds: a qualifying round and an elite round. In the qualifying round, 53 national teams competed in 13 groups of four teams, with each group winner and runner-up, plus the best third-placed team, advancing to the elite round. There, the 27 first-round qualifiers plus Germany, who was given a bye, were distributed in seven groups of four teams. The winner of each group qualified for the final tournament.

Qualified teams

1 Only counted appearances for under-17 era (bold indicates champion for that year, while italic indicates hosts)

Final draw
The draw for the group stage of the final tournament was held on 9 April 2014 at Saint James Cavalier in Valletta. It was conducted by UEFA's Youth and Amateur Football Committee chairman Jim Boyce, along with Fr. Hilary Tagliaferro and former Maltese international David Carabott. The host team, Malta, was automatically assigned as team one in group A, while the remaining teams were drawn successively in the order B1, A2, B2, A3, B3, A4 and B4.

Venues

Ta' Qali National Stadium, Ta' Qali, (capacity: 18,000)
Hibernians Ground, Paola (capacity: 2,000)
Gozo Stadium, Xewkija (capacity: 4,000)

Squads

Match officials

Referees
 Nikola Dabanović (Montenegro)
 Alexander Harkam (Austria)
 Andreas Ekberg (Sweden)
 Aleksandrs Anufrijevs (Latvia)
 Jonathan Lardot (Belgium)
 Aliyar Aghayev (Azerbaijan)

Assistant referees
 István Albert (Hungary)
 Audrius Jagintavičius (Lithuania)
 Dag-Roger Nebben (Norway)
 Mesrop Ghazaryan (Armenia)
 David Elias Biton (Israel)
 Oleksandr Korniyko (Ukraine)
 Jure Praprotnik (Slovenia)
 David Chigogidze (Georgia)

Fourth officials
 Clayton Pisani (Malta)
 Alan Mario Sant (Malta)

Group stage

Fixtures and match schedule were confirmed by UEFA on 15 April 2014.

Tie-breaking
If two or more teams were equal on points on completion of the group matches, the following tie-breaking criteria were applied:
 Higher number of points obtained in the matches played between the teams in question;
 Superior goal difference resulting from the matches played between the teams in question;
 Higher number of goals scored in the matches played between the teams in question;
If, after having applied criteria 1 to 3, teams still have an equal ranking, criteria 1 to 3 are reapplied exclusively to the matches between the teams in question to determine their final rankings. If this procedure does not lead to a decision, criteria 4 to 7 apply.

If only two teams are tied (according to criteria 1–7) after having met in the last match of the group stage, their ranking is determined by a penalty shoot-out.

All times are in Central European Summer Time (UTC+02:00).

Group A

Group B

Knockout stage
In the knockout stage, penalty shoot-out is used to decide the winner if necessary (no extra time is played).

Bracket

Semi-finals

Final

Team of the Tournament

Goalkeepers	
  Yanick van Osch
  Gregor Kobel
Defenders
  Jonjoe Kenny
  Tafari Moore
  Joe Gomez
  Calvin Verdonk
  Ferro
  Lukas Boeder

Midfielders
  Ryan Ledson
  Aidan Nesbitt
  Jari Schuurman
  Rúben Neves
  Renato Sanches
  Dimitri Oberlin
Forwards
  Steven Bergwijn
  Enes Ünal
  Patrick Roberts
  Alexandre Silva

Goalscorers
4 goals
 Dominic Solanke
 Jari Schuurman

3 goals

 Patrick Roberts
 Calvin Verdonk
 Steven Bergwijn
 Fatih Aktay

2 goals

 Adam Armstrong
 Abdelhak Nouri
 Dani van der Moot
 Luís Mata
 Enes Ünal

1 goal

 Jonjoe Kenny
 Benjamin Henrichs
 Aidan Friggieri
 Joseph Mbong
 Bilal Ould-Chikh
 Segun Owobowale
 Pedro Rodrigues
 Renato Sanches
 Ryan Hardie
 Jake Sheppard
 Craig Wighton
 Scott Wright
 Boris Babic
 Dimitri Oberlin
 Hayrullah Alici

References

External links
Official tournament site at UEFA
Official tournament site at Malta Football Association

 
Uefa
2014
2014
UEFA

May 2014 sports events in Europe
2014 in youth association football